Odil Yakubov is an Uzbek writer who died in December 2009 at the age of 83.

He wrote dozens of novels and was celebrated as a writer, both in the Soviet era as in the first decade of the independence of Uzbekistan since 1991. He served as chairman of the Uzbek Writers Union from 1987 to 1992. Also, he was editor-in-chief of the newspaper "Uzbekistan Literature and Art," and heading the Uzbek state film studio.

He was vice president of the Assembly of Culture of Central Asia and served in the Congress of People's Deputies while Mikhail Gorbachev was president.

His writing reflected care for people's demands of officials and a skeptic attitude towards the state.

Yakubov raised important political issues, such as cotton monoculture and Uzbek soldiers dying during the Soviet–Afghan War, during sessions of the Congress of People's Deputies.

Among Yakubov's most famous publications in the Uzbek language are the short stories titled "Peers," "Two Loves," "Muqaddas," "Bird Wings," and novels "It's Not Easy To Become A Man," "Treasures of Ulugbek," "Conscience," "White-White Swans," and "Justice."

He was a close friend of the Kyrgyz writer Chingiz Aitmatov, who died in June 2008.

References

National University of Uzbekistan alumni
Uzbekistani writers
Soviet writers
1926 births
2009 deaths